Rafael Lopes Ferreira or simply Rafael Lopes (born September 29, 1986 in Parauapebas), is a Brazilian right back. He currently plays for Águia de Marabá.

Title
São Paulo
 Brazilian League: 1
 2008

External links
 CBF

1986 births
Living people
Brazilian footballers
São Paulo FC players
Sport Club Corinthians Alagoano players
Águia de Marabá Futebol Clube players
Association football defenders
Sportspeople from Pará